"Telephone Line" is a song by English rock band Electric Light Orchestra (ELO). It was released in May 1977 through Jet Records and United Artists Records as part of the album A New World Record. It was very successful, reaching the Top 10 in Australia, US, and UK, and number 1 in Canada.

Background
The ballad is track two on their 1976 album, A New World Record, and was the final single to be released from the album until September 2006, when "Surrender" was released from the expanded reissue of the album. It became their biggest single success in the US and was their first UK gold award for a single. With ELO's continuing success in America it seemed obvious to frontman Jeff Lynne to use an American ring tone during the song. Lynne explained:

The song charted in the Top Ten in both the UK and the US, peaking at number 8 in the UK and number 7 in the US.  The tune was on the Hot 100 for 23 weeks, nearly a full month longer on that chart than any other ELO tune. Billboard ranked it as the No. 15 song of 1977.  In 1977, the song reached number 1 in New Zealand and Canada.  "Telephone Line" and Meri Wilson's "Telephone Man" were back-to-back on Hot 100's top 40 for two non-consecutive weeks in the summer of 1977.

As was the norm, many ELO singles were issued in different colours, but the US version of this single was the only green single ELO issued. The US single also was shortened to 3:56 with an early fade.  It became the band's first single to achieve Gold sales figures.

Critical reception 
AllMusic's Donald Guarisco said the song's lyrics "use the scenario of a lovelorn narrator trying to talk a telephone operator into connecting him with a lover who won't answer her phone, a scenario that has been used in songs as diverse as "Memphis, Tennessee" and "Operator"," adding that the song "could have easily become an over-the-top exercise in camp but is saved by a gorgeous melody that contrasts verses full of yearning highs and aching lows with a descending-note chorus that clinches the song's heartbroken feel." He concluded that the arrangement transformed "Telephone Line" into a "miniature symphony".

AllMusic's Bruce Eder said that "Telephone Line" "might be the best Lennon–McCartney collaboration that never was, lyrical and soaring in a way that manages to echo elements of Revolver and the Beatles without ever mimicking them."  Ultimate Classic Rock critic Michael Gallucci rated it ELO's 4th best song, calling it a "futuristic-sounding song with a classic melody."

Billboard felt that production elements such as the telephone sound effects and "doo-wah chorus" gave the song a "50s feel" and credited the orchestration for the song's success.  Cash Box said that "Jeff Lynne's voice verges on the choking sob, and the unearthy strings and "doobie-doo-wa's" should clinch top 40 ears." Record World called it a "rock ballad of lost love" that is an example of "ELO's ability to take familiar rock 'n' roll structures and transform them into space epics."

Covers and other uses
"Telephone Line" is the theme song of the 1977 film Joyride starring Desi Arnaz, Jr., Robert Carradine, Melanie Griffith, and Anne Lockhart, directed by Joseph Ruben.

Charts

Weekly charts

Year-end charts

Certifications

Jeff Lynne versions
Jeff Lynne re-recorded the song in his own home studio. It was released in a compilation album with other re-recorded ELO songs, under the ELO name.

In 2012, as part of the concert from his home studio, Live From Bungalow Palace, Lynne performed an acoustic version of the song with longtime ELO pianist Richard Tandy.

References

External links
In-depth Song Analysis at the Jeff Lynne Song Database (jefflynnesongs.com)
 

1970s ballads
1977 singles
1977 songs
Song recordings produced by Jeff Lynne
Electric Light Orchestra songs
Songs written by Jeff Lynne
RPM Top Singles number-one singles
Number-one singles in New Zealand
Songs about telephone calls
British soft rock songs
Jet Records singles
United Artists Records singles
1976 songs
Rock ballads